Agonoriascus lapidicola is a species of beetle in the family Carabidae, the only species in the genus Agonoriascus.

References

Platyninae